This is a list of South African television related events from 2003.

Events
31 July - Bop TV shuts down.
19 October - Anke Pietrangeli wins the second season of Idols South Africa.

Debuts

International
13 January -  Footballers' Wives (SABC 3)
10 March -  Everwood (M-Net)
14 March - / Jeremiah (SABC 3)
31 March -  What I Like About You (M-Net)
7 July -  The Wire (M-Net)
 Teenage Mutant Ninja Turtles (2003) (M-Net)
 Life with Bonnie (M-Net)
 Kerching! (M-Net)
 Preston Pig (M-Net)
 Fimbles (SABC 1)
/ Dragon Tales (SABC 1)
/ Eckhart (SABC 1)

Changes of network affiliation

Television shows

1980s
Good Morning South Africa (1985–present)
Carte Blanche (1988–present)

1990s
Top Billing (1992–present)
Generations (1994–present)
Isidingo (1998–present)
Who Wants to Be a Millionaire? (1999-2005)

2000s
Idols South Africa (2002–present)

Defunct channels
31 July - Bop TV

Ending this year

Births

Deaths

See also
2003 in South Africa